Sri Kshetra Adi Chunchanagiri is a 2012 Indian Kannada-language devotional film directed by Om Sai Prakash starring Ambareesh, Sriimurali, Ramkumar, Shivakumar and Harish Raj.

Cast 

Ambareesh as a king
Sriimurali as Balagangadharanatha Swamiji
Ramkumar
Shivakumar
Harish Raj as Narada Muni
Ravi Chethan as Kalabhairaveshwara
Jayanthi
Shruti
Anu Prabhakar
Padma Vasanthi
C. P. Yogeshwara
B. C. Patil
Cheluvarayaswamy
H Vishwanath
K Abhayachandra Jain
 HC Balakrishna
C S Puttarajau
M Putte Gowda
K B Chandrasheka
Suresh Gowda
Ramaswamy Gowda
 Ramesh Bandisidde Gowda
M Srinivas
LR Shivarame Gowda
HM Revanna
 HT Krishnappa
Doddarangegowda
 B Ramakrishna 
Ashwathanarayana
Ashok Kheny
T. S. Nagabharana
Om Sai Prakash
Nagathihalli Chandrashekhar
Mohan Juneja
Ramesh Bhat
Karibasavaiah
Bullet Prakash

Production 
Director Om Sai Prakash decided to make a devotional and mythological film and consulted Balagangadharanatha Swamiji before working on the film. Murali, whose career was at a low at the time, decided to accept the role of Balagangadharanatha Swamiji as Om Sai Prakash delivered several successful films. To prepare for the role of Balagangadharanatha Swamiji, Murali shaved his head. For months, he ate only vegeterian food, did not drink alcohol and called people as "my child". Forty political leaders play roles in the film. 	Sundarnath Suvarna of Sri Manjunatha (2001) fame was brought in as the cinematographer after Om Sai Prakash was impressed by his work. A procession for Balagangadharanatha Swamiji from Freedom Park to Palace Grounds was recorded and used for the film.

Soundtrack 
The music was composed by Gurukiran. An audio release function was held on 29 January 2012 coinciding with the birthday of  Sri Adhichunchanagiri Maha Samsthana Mutt.

All lyrics were composed by Doddarangegowda except where noted.

Release and reception 
The film was released on 6 July 2012, and it was screened in theatres until August of the same year.

A critic from Prajavani criticised the film's narration while praising the performance of the actors.

References